Notostigma carazzii is a species of ant belonging to the genus Notostigma. The ant was first described by Emery in 1895. The species is endemic to Australia. Specimens are mainly found in the state of Queensland, and foraging workers are  solitarily and nocturnal.

A journal article by George Wheeler observed the larvae of the species. Lengths for very young larva is 3.7 mm, young larva 5.4-10.2 mm, immature larvae around 8.7-10.3 mm and mature larvae grow to lengths of 8.3-15.4 mm.

References

External links

Formicinae
Insects described in 1895
Hymenoptera of Australia
Insects of Australia